Rudé právo (Czech for Red Justice or The Red Right) was the official newspaper of the Communist Party of Czechoslovakia.

History and profile
Rudé právo was founded in 1920 when the party was splitting from the social democrats and their older daily Právo lidu (People's Right). During the 1920s and 1930s it was often censored and even temporarily stopped. In autumn 1938 the party was abolished and during the German occupation and World War II that came soon afterwards the newspaper became an underground mimeographed pamphlet. Following the end of the war Josef Frolík became the chief administrator of the paper. After the communist take-over in 1948 it became the leading newspaper in the country, the Czechoslovak equivalent of the Soviet Union's Pravda, highly propagandistic and sometimes obedient to the government. Its Slovak equivalent in Slovakia was Pravda.

Rudé právo had a circulation of over one million daily, making it the most widely distributed newspaper in Czechoslovakia. The communist government promoted its sales, for example, by sometimes forbidding other newspapers to be sold before 10am, or kiosk owners might be paid to not sell other papers at all, or the presses that printed rival newspapers could just be ordered not to print them.

Following the Velvet Revolution, Rudé právo was privatised in 1989. In addition, some editors founded a new daily, Právo, unaffiliated with the party but taking advantage of the existing reader base.

In popular culture
 In the book Life is Elsewhere by Milan Kundera, Jaromil, the protagonist, makes a reference to reading Rudé právo.
 In the 2006 movie Bobby, Svetlana Metkina plays a Czechoslovak reporter for Rudé právo who is granted an interview with Robert F. Kennedy.

See also
Eastern Bloc information dissemination

References

External links
 Digital archive (1945–1950)
 Digital archive (1950–1989)

1920 establishments in Czechoslovakia
1990 disestablishments in Czechoslovakia
Communist newspapers
Communist Party of Czechoslovakia
Czech-language newspapers
Defunct newspapers published in Czechoslovakia
Eastern Bloc mass media
Newspapers published in Prague
Newspapers established in 1920
Publications disestablished in 1990